{{DISPLAYTITLE:D-arabinitol dehydrogenase (NADP+)}}

D-arabinitol dehydrogenase (NADP+) (NADP+-dependent D-arabitol dehydrogenase, ARD1p, D-arabitol dehydrogenase 1) is an enzyme with systematic name D-arabinitol:NADP+ oxidoreductase. This enzyme catalyses the following chemical reaction

 (1) D-arabinitol + NADP+  D-xylulose + NADPH + H+
 (2) D-arabinitol + NADP+  D-ribulose + NADPH + H+

The enzyme present in the fungus Uromyces fabae can make use D-arabinitol and D-mannitol in the forward direction, and D-xylulose, D-ribulose and D-fructose in the reverse direction.

References

External links 
 

EC 1.1.1